DGC Records (an initialism for the David Geffen Company) was an American record label that operated as a division of Interscope Geffen A&M Records, which is owned by the Universal Music Group.

History
DGC Records was launched in 1990 as a subsidiary label of Geffen Records and was distributed by Warner Bros. Records until 1991, when it was acquired by MCA Music Entertainment Group. The label was created as a response to the success Geffen had with the harder rock acts on its roster.  Though it initially focused on more progressive rock and heavy metal, as the decade progressed it also embraced the emergence of (and become a seminal label of) alternative rock, with influential acts like Nirvana, Sonic Youth, Hole, Weezer and Beck.  The label also released early titles by hip hop band The Roots.

In 1999, during the consolidation of Geffen's Universal Music Group parent and PolyGram, the DGC label ceased operations.  The retained acts went on to record for the main Geffen label.  In the years to follow, the DGC title and logo occasionally appeared on reissues of its past catalog items.  In 2007, the label was revived as a brand for Interscope Records, inheriting many alternative acts signed to Interscope Geffen A&M (including acts that previously recorded for DreamWorks Records).  Since its reactivation, it has released albums by Weezer, Beck, Counting Crows and Rise Against. DGC Records, in partnership with MySpace Records and indie Lucky Ear Music, signed up-and-coming Los Angeles based artist Meiko. In December 2010, Luke Wood stepped down as president of the label. The label went inactive in 2013.

To date, the best-selling album in the DGC catalog is Nevermind, the 1991 album by Nirvana, reaching international sales of 25 million copies worldwide, with ten million copies sold in the United States, and was one of the first albums on the label to be certified Diamond.

Artists
The following artists have recorded for DGC Records:

The All-American Rejects
All Time Low
Arc Angels
Murray Attaway
Beck
Bivouac
Black Lab
Black Tide
Blink-182
Boss Hog
Brand New
The Candyskins
Cell
Ceremony
Toni Childs
Ciccone Youth
Coldplay
Counting Crows
Rivers Cuomo
Dashboard Confessional
D.O.E.
Drivin' N' Cryin'
Elastica
Embrace
Enter Shikari
Escape the Fate 
Fluorescein
The Freewheelers
froSTed
Galactic Cowboys
Game
Girls Against Boys
Gutterboy
Ted Hawkins
Harvester (American band)
Hog
Hole
Hunk
Jasper and the Prodigal Sons
Jawbreaker
Jimmy Eat World'''
King of Kings
Klaxons
Linoleum
Little Caesar
Loud Lucy
Aimee Mann
Meiko
Thurston Moore
Nelson
Nirvana
Papa Roach
Pell Mell
Pere Ubu
Pitchshifter
The Posies
Queens of the Stone Age
The Raincoats
Remy Zero
Rev Theory
Rise Against
Tyson Ritter
Kane Roberts
The Roots
Sammy
60 Ft. Dolls
Skiploader
Sloan
Slowpoke
Sonic Youth
Southern Culture on the Skids
St. Johnny
Street Drum Corps
The Sugarplastic
Sugartooth
The Sundays
Switches
that dog.
Teenage Fanclub
Terri Nunn
Them Crooked Vultures
TV on the Radio
Urge Overkill
Veruca Salt
Kate Voegele
Billy Joe Walker, Jr.
Warrior Soul
Weezer
White Zombie
Wild Colonials
Wolfmother
Yeah Yeah Yeahs
Yelawolf
Rob Zombie

See also 

 List of record labels
 DGC Rarities Vol. 1

References

External links
 DGC Records Official Website

Record labels established in 1990
American record labels
Alternative rock record labels
Rock record labels
Comcast subsidiaries
Labels distributed by Universal Music Group
Companies based in Santa Monica, California
Companies based in California
Companies based in Los Angeles County, California
David Geffen